Mohammad Zazrir Naim bin Abdul Rani is a Malaysian footballer who plays as an attacking midfielder for Malaysia Super League club PDRM

References

External links
 

1999 births
Living people
Sri Pahang FC players
Malaysian footballers
Malaysian people of Malay descent
Malaysia Super League players
Association football midfielders